Croitoru, Croitor are Romanian-language surnames derived from the occupation of croitor, meaning "tailor".

Adrian Croitoru (born 1971), Romanian judoka
Alexandra Croitoru (born 1975), Romanian photographer
B. Croitoru (Ştrul Leiba Croitoru) birth name of Ion Călugăru (1902–1956), Romanian writer, journalist and critic
Constantin Croitoru (born 1952), former Chief of the Romanian Air Force Staff
Florin Croitoru (born 1993), Romanian weightlifter
Ion Croitoru (1963–2017), Canadian professional wrestler
Lucian Croitoru (born 1957), Romanian economist
Marius Croitoru (born 1980), Romanian professional football manager
Ştrul Leiba Croitoru, birth name of Ion Călugăru 

Occupational surnames
Romanian-language surnames